Epanastasis eupracta is a moth of the family Autostichidae. It is found on the Canary Islands.

References

Moths described in 1988
Epanastasis